William John Gray (5  March 1882 – 18 November 1916) was a Scottish professional footballer who played at left half for Partick Thistle and Southampton.

Football career
Gray was born in Inverness and began his youth career with local club Inverness Thistle. He started his professional career with Partick Thistle. After five years, he moved to southern England to join Southampton of the Southern League to replace Kelly Houlker who had returned to Blackburn Rovers.

Gray made his "Saints" debut in the opening match of the 1906–07 season and his form meant that he rarely missed a match until an injury sustained in a 5–1 defeat at Reading in March brought his season to a premature end, with James Bowden eventually replacing him.

Apparently unhappy in the south of England, Gray returned to Scotland in the summer of 1907 to resume his career with Partick Thistle.

Personal life 
Gray served as a corporal in the Seaforth Highlanders during the First World War and died in France on 18 November 1916. He is buried in Abbeville Communal Cemetery Extension.

References

1882 births
Scottish footballers
Association football wing halves
Scottish Football League players
Southern Football League players
Partick Thistle F.C. players
Southampton F.C. players
Inverness Thistle F.C. players
1916 deaths
British military personnel killed in World War I
British Army personnel of World War I
Seaforth Highlanders soldiers
Footballers from Inverness
Burials at the Abbeville Communal Cemetery